Georges Ronsse (4 March 1906, Antwerp - 4 July 1969, Berchem) was a two-time national cyclo-cross and two-time world champion road bicycle racer from Belgium, who raced between 1926 and 1938.

In addition to his several national and world championships, Ronsse won several of the classic races in road cycling including the 1925 Liège–Bastogne–Liège, the 1927 Paris–Roubaix, and the 1927, 1929 and 1930 editions of the now-defunct Bordeaux–Paris. He won his first world championship title in 1928 in Budapest with a lead of 19 minutes and 43 seconds over second-placed finisher Herbert Nebe, the largest winning margin in road world championship history.

In 1932, Ronsse capped off his career with a Stage 4 win at the 1932 Tour de France. After retiring from competition he served as manager of the Belgian national team at the Tour.

Major results

1925
Liège–Bastogne–Liège
1927
Paris–Roubaix
Bordeaux–Paris
Scheldeprijs
1928
 World Cycling Championship
Paris–Brussels
Rupelmonde
1929
 World Cycling Championship
Bordeaux–Paris
 Belgian National Cyclo-cross Championships
1930
GP Wolber
Bordeaux–Paris
Nationale Sluitingsprijs
 Belgian National Cyclo-cross Championships
1932
Tour de France
Winner stage 4
5th place overall classification
1934
 national track stayers championship
1935
 national track stayers championship
1936
 national track stayers championship

References

External links 

Official Tour de France results for Georges Ronsse

1906 births
1969 deaths
Cyclo-cross cyclists
Belgian male cyclists
Belgian Tour de France stage winners
UCI Road World Champions (elite men)
Cyclists from Antwerp
Belgian cyclo-cross champions